Municipal elections were held in Bologna on 5 and 19 June 2016. The centre-left candidate Virginio Merola was elected mayor at the second round with 54.64% of votes.

Voting system
The voting system is used for all mayoral elections in Italy, in the city with a population higher than 15,000 inhabitants. Under this system voters express a direct choice for the mayor or an indirect choice voting for the party of the candidate's coalition. If no candidate receives 50% of votes, the top two candidates go to a second round after two weeks. This gives a result whereby the winning candidate may be able to claim majority support, although it is not guaranteed.

The election of the City Council is based on a direct choice for the candidate with a preference vote: the candidate with the majority of the preferences is elected. The number of the seats for each party is determined proportionally.

Parties and candidates
This is a list of the parties (and their respective leaders) which will participate in the election.

Opinion polling

Results

Notes: if a defeated candidate for Mayor obtained over 3% of votes, the mayoral candidate is automatically elected communal councilor (Borgonzoni, Bugani, Bernardini and Martelloni); see Italian electoral law of 1993 for Comuni. The candidate elected Mayor is not a member of communal council, but Merola votes in the communal council (see Italian electoral law 1993).

References

2016 elections in Italy
Bologna
Bologna
Elections in Bologna
May 2016 events in Italy